Live Riot is the first live album from the Modesto, CA based contemporary worship band Worthy Dying For (now Fearless BND), released by Ammunition Records in February 2012.

Track listing

Standard edition
"Rebuild" (featuring Jeremy Johnson) – 2:47
"Arise" (featuring Rochelle Leguern) – 3:28
"Never Look Back" (featuring Sean Loche) – 4:12
"Freedom Is Rising" (featuring Dalisha Turner) – 3:09
"One Love" (featuring Christy Johnson) – 3:58
"Love Riot" (featuring Sean Loche & Christy Johnson) – 3:30
"The World Can't Take It Away" (featuring Christy Johnson) – 3:43
"Risen from the Grave" (featuring Sean Loche) – 9:10
"Closer" (featuring Deanna Joven & Nick Morris) – 5:58
"All I Want (Closer Reprise)" [featuring Deanna Joven] – 5:44
"Higher" (featuring Christy Johnson) – 5:25
"Send Your Glory Down" (featuring Sean Loche & Sarah Agbayani) – 5:36
"Power of Your Love" (featuring Christy Johnson) – 7:00
"Spirit of God" (featuring Nick Morris & Christy Johnson) – 6:36
"Light a Fire" (featuring Christy Johnson) – 5:23
"Taking Back" (featuring Sean Loche) – 4:02
"Savior" (featuring Christy Johnson) – 3:52
"Rebuild (Radio Edit)" [featuring Jeremy Johnson] – 2:49

Bonus tracks
Album Story (Video) – 5:39
"The World Can't Take It Away (Video)" – 3:45
"Light a Fire (Video)" – 4:44
"Love Riot (Video)" – 3:30
"One Love (Video)" – 4:00
"Rebuild (Video)" – 3:13
"Risen from the Grave (Video)" – 8:23
Have the Keys (Video) – 48:48

Chart performance 
Live Riot reached #38 on the Billboard Christian Albums chart.

References

External links 
Official Website

2012 live albums
Live Christian music albums
Fearless BND albums